Moch may refer to:

Places 
 Moch, Chuuk, an island and municipality in the Federated States of Micronesia

People 
 Moch, Palatine of Hungary (12–13th century), Hungarian lord
 Cheryl Moch, American writer
 Dontay Moch (born 1988), American football player
 Gaston Moch (1859–1935), French activist
 Jules Moch (1893–1985), French politician
 Manfred Moch (1930–2011), German musician
 Robert Moch (1914–2005), American rower

See also 
 Johannes Mötsch (born 1949), German historian
 Mosh (disambiguation)